Archips strigopterus is a species of moth of the family Tortricidae. It is found in Sichuan, China.

The length of the forewings is 10–11 mm for males and about 11 mm for females. The forewings are brown. The hindwings are greyish brown.

References

Moths described in 1987
Archips
Moths of Asia